Hemicriconemoides kanayaensis is a plant pathogenic nematode affecting the tea plant.

References

External links 
 Nemaplex, University of California - Hemicriconemoides kanayaensis

Tylenchida
Agricultural pest nematodes
Tea diseases